Ontario Municipal Airport  is three miles west of Ontario, in Malheur County, Oregon. The National Plan of Integrated Airport Systems for 2011–2015 categorized it as a general aviation facility.

The first airline flights were Empire Airlines Boeing 247Ds in late 1946; successors West Coast, Air West and Hughes Airwest served Ontario until 1973.

Facilities
The airport covers 480 acres (194 ha) at an elevation of 2,193 feet (668 m). Its one runway, 14/32, is 5,011 by 100 feet (1,527 x 30 m) asphalt.

In the year ending July 13, 2010 the airport had 12,930 general aviation aircraft operations, average 35 per day. 69 aircraft were then based at the airport: 90% single-engine, 3% multi-engine, 4% jet, and 3% helicopter.

References

External links 
 Airport page at City of Ontario website
 Aerial image as of May 1994 from USGS The National Map
 

Airports in Malheur County, Oregon
Ontario, Oregon